Worker-Peasant Party was a communist party in Costa Rica. It was mainly based in Cartago Province. The party was led by Juan Diego Fernández, and was of Maoist orientation.

References

Political parties established in 1977
Communist parties in Costa Rica
Defunct Maoist parties
Defunct political parties in Costa Rica
Political parties with year of disestablishment missing
Political parties with year of establishment missing
Maoism in North America